Hector Raemaekers (8 September 1883 – 3 December 1963) was a Belgian footballer. He played in twelve matches for the Belgium national football team from 1905 to 1913.

References

External links
 

1883 births
1963 deaths
Belgian footballers
Belgium international footballers
Place of birth missing
Association football defenders